Mohammad Sahiduzzaman is a Bangladesh Nationalist Party politician and the former Member of Parliament of Cox's Bazar-3.

Career
Sahiduzzaman was elected to parliament from Cox's Bazar-3 as a Bangladesh Nationalist Party candidate in 2001. After failing to get the Bangladesh Nationalist Party nomination in 2008, he contested the election as an independent candidate.

References

Bangladesh Nationalist Party politicians
Living people
8th Jatiya Sangsad members
Year of birth missing (living people)